The South Branch Stroudwater River is a  stream in Cumberland County, Maine, in the United States. It is a tributary of the Stroudwater River, part of the watershed of the Fore River, the harbor for the city of Portland.

The South Branch rises in Scarborough at the junction of Fogg Brook and Silver Brook and flows northeast into the town of Gorham, where it joins the Stroudwater River near the village of South Gorham.

See also
List of rivers of Maine

References

Maine Streamflow Data from the USGS
Maine Watershed Data From Environmental Protection Agency

Rivers of Maine